The Guadalupe junco (Junco insularis) is a small bird in the New World sparrow family that is endemic to Guadalupe Island off the western coast of Baja California, Mexico. Many taxonomic authorities classified it in 2008 as a subspecies of the dark-eyed junco (Junco hyemalis). In 2016, it was re-classified as a full species.

Description and ecology
The Guadalupe junco has a dull grayish head with a gray bill and brownish upperparts. Its wings and tail are blackish, though the tail has white edges. Its underparts are white with a rufous fringe at the bottom of the wings. It makes a high, sharp sik and a long series of chipping notes.

This bird is today found mainly in the Guadalupe cypress (Cupressus guadalupensis) grove on Guadalupe Island, with a few birds in the remaining Monterey pine (Pinus radiata) stands. Around 1900, it was known to utilize almost any habitat for breeding. It ranged over the whole island for feeding then, and indeed still does theoretically, but actually only a handful of flocks exist. A testimony to the adaptability of this junco is the fact that, today, a few birds breed at the seashore in non-native tree tobacco (Nicotiana glauca) shrubs, since this is dense enough to provide some protection from feral cats.

The breeding season is from February to June. Three to four eggs are laid in a bulky cup nest of dried grass stems, which is either in a depression in the ground or in the lower branches of a tree. The eggs are greenish-white with reddish-brown spots. If food is plentiful, the birds apparently breed twice a year.

Decline to near-extinction
This bird used to be abundant, but now only 50–100 adult birds are thought to survive. Domestic goats (Capra hircus) introduced to provide food for fishermen and to start a meat canning plant in the early to mid-19th century became feral and overran the island by the late 19th century, with more than four goats per hectare (nearly two per acre) being present around the 1870s. Domestic cats (Felis catus) introduced to the island next also became feral and multiplied, and as the habitat was destroyed by the feral goats, the feral cats wreaked havoc on the endemic fauna. In 1897, Kaeding found the Guadalupe junco "abundant", but already decreasing due to feral cat predation. Anthony summed up 10 years of occasional visits in 1901 by noting that "...the juncos are slowly but surely becoming scarce." He blamed the interaction of feral goats destroying the habitat and feral cats destroying the birds themselves.

Wilmot W. Brown Jr., H. W. Marsden and Ignacio Oroso surveyed Guadalupe throughout May and June 1906, and collected numerous bird specimens for the Thayer Museum – among these a "large series" of the Guadalupe junco. They found the Guadalupe junco "fairly abundant" but, despite the depredations of the feral cats, still "a very tame, confiding little bird" – in other words, unwary of predators.

The feral goats were all but exterminated by 2006 by the Grupo de Ecologia y Conservacion de Islas and Island Conservation, permitting spectacular regeneration of the native flora. The island was recently protected as a biosphere reserve again by the above groups. As the habitat regenerates and especially if the planned extermination or containment of the feral cats will be undertaken, the remaining Guadalupe juncos will surely find more protected breeding and feeding sites. Indeed, the future of the Guadalupe junco looks better than it did during the 20th century, although it is still precariously close to extinction and could be wiped out by any chance event, such as a violent storm or an introduced disease. On the IUCN Red List, it is classified as Endangered.

Footnotes

Further reading
 Howell, Steven N. G. & Webb, Sophie (1995): A Guide to the Birds of Mexico and Northern Central America. Oxford University Press, Oxford & New York. 

Guadalupe junco
Endemic birds of Western Mexico
Birds of Mexico
Guadalupe junco
Taxa named by Robert Ridgway